Winston Vallenilla (born Winston Teofilactes Vallenilla Hazell;  September 22, 1973) is a Venezuelan television host and actor. Vallenilla is President of TVes  (Televisora Venezolana Social), a Venezuelan television station managed by a foundation associated with the Venezuelan Ministry of Communications and Information. He is known and fiercely criticized for his political views and support of Chavismo.  He was defeated as the 2013 PSUV candidate for mayor in the municipality of Baruta.

Biography
Vallenilla was born in Caracas on 22 September 1973. In 1996, he participated in the Mister Venezuela competition.  He ran unsuccessfully for the mayor of the Baruta municipality in 2013. and, as a political ally and supporter of Nicolás Maduro, was later named president of TVes.

He has been criticized for his messages regarding the political situation in Venezuela, and for calling opposition protests in Venezuela a "show"; Maduro responded that Vallenilla is an excellent man, and that critics are "envious".

Personal life
Vallenilla is married to Zita Marlene de Andrade de Sousa (aka Marlene De Andrade), an actress. They met during the filming of the telenovela Mujer con pantalones in 2005. In August 2011, their first child was born.

Filmography
Presenter
 Aló RCTV (RCTV)
 Aprieta y gana 
 Animalia
 La Guerra de los sexos

Telenovelas
2012: Mi ex me tiene ganas as Espartaco Sansegundo
2006: Por todo lo alto as Ruben Alegría
2005: Mujer con pantalones as Juan José Rondón
2000: Mariú as Dr. Leonardo Izaguirre
1998: Aunque me Cueste la Vida as Pedro Armando Reverón
1996: La Llaman Mariamor as Jhonny 
1992: Cara Sucia as Freddy

References

External links
 

1973 births
Male actors from Caracas
RCTV personalities
Venezuelan television presenters
Venezuelan male telenovela actors
Living people